Chah Dasht-e Buheng (also Romanized as Chāh Dasht-e Būheng; also known as Chāh Dasht-e Bavīng) is a village in Jazmurian Rural District, Jazmurian District, Rudbar-e Jonubi County, Kerman Province, Iran. At the 2006 census, its population was 1,235, in 234 families.

References 

Populated places in Rudbar-e Jonubi County